Sylvan Lake is a city in Oakland County in the U.S. state of Michigan. The population was 1,720 at the 2010 census. The city also shares a northeastern border with the city of Pontiac.   

Sylvan Lake borders Keego Harbor on the west.

The city uses the tag line "the prettiest little city in the State of Michigan"

Geography

Demographics

2010 census
As of the census of 2010, there were 1,720 people, 809 households, and 474 families living in the city. The racial makeup of the city was 94.5% White, 2.2% African American, 0.3% Native American, 0.7% Asian, 0.5% from other races, and 1.7% from two or more races. Hispanic or Latino of any race were 1.5% of the population.

There were 809 households, of which 26.9% had children under the age of 18 living with them, 45.9% were married couples living together, 8.7% had a female householder with no husband present, 4.1% had a male householder with no wife present, and 41.4% were non-families. 34.9% of all households were made up of individuals, and 9.5% had someone living alone who was 65 years of age or older. The average household size was 2.13 and the average family size was 2.76.

The median age in the city was 44.8 years. 20.1% of residents were under the age of 18; 4.2% were between the ages of 18 and 24; 26% were from 25 to 44; 33.7% were from 45 to 64; and 16% were 65 years of age or older. The gender makeup of the city was 49.3% male and 50.7% female.

2000 census
As of the census of 2000, there were 1,735 people, 826 households, and 465 families living in the city. The racial makeup of the city was 95.39% White, 1.21% African American, 0.46% Native American, 0.81% Asian, and 2.13% from two or more races. Hispanic or Latino of any race were 1.10% of the population.

There were 826 households, out of which 20.5% had children under the age of 18 living with them, 46.4% were married couples living together, 6.7% had a female householder with no husband present, and 43.7% were non-families. 36.6% of all households were made up of individuals, and 9.8% had someone living alone who was 65 years of age or older.  The average household size was 2.09 and the average family size was 2.76.

In the city, the population was spread out, with 18.0% under the age of 18, 4.4% from 18 to 24, 36.9% from 25 to 44, 25.8% from 45 to 64, and 14.9% who were 65 years of age or older.  The median age was 40 years. For every 100 females, there were 96.5 males.  For every 100 females age 18 and over, there were 94.7 males.

The median income for a household in the city was $71,875, and the median income for a family was $90,931. Males had a median income of $70,526 versus $45,341 for females. The per capita income for the city was $48,744.  About 0.6% of families and 2.0% of the population were below the poverty line, including none of those under age 18 and 1.8% of those age 65 or over.

Education
A portion is in the Pontiac School District.

About 10% of Sylvan Lake is within the West Bloomfield School District.

References

External links

City of Sylvan Lake
Sylvan Lake Home and Garden Tour

Cities in Oakland County, Michigan
Metro Detroit
Populated places established in 1824
1824 establishments in Michigan Territory